Malaysia competed in the 2002 Asian Games held in Busan, South Korea, from 29 September to 14 October 2002. Athletes from the Malaysia won overall 30 medals (including six golds), and clinched twelfth spot in the medal table. Mohd Khalid Mohd Yunus was the chief of the delegation.

Medal summary

Medals by sport

Multiple medalists
Malaysian competitors that have won at least two medals.

Medallists
The following Malaysian competitors won medals at the games; all dates are for October 2002.

Archery

Women

Athletics

Men
Track events

Field event

Women
Track and road events

Badminton

Men's team
Quarterfinal

Semifinal

Ranked 3rd in final standings

Women's team
Quarterfinal

Basketball

Women's tournament
Preliminary round

Ranked 6th in final standings

Bodybuilding

Men

Bowling

Singles

Doubles

Trios

Team

Masters

Boxing

Cue sports

Men

Cycling

Track
Sprint

Points race

Keirin

Diving

Men

Women

Equestrian

Dressage

Jumping

Field hockey

Men's tournament

Football

Men's tournament

Golf

Men

Gymnastics

Artistic
Men

Rhythmic
Women

Kabaddi

Men's tournament

Karate

Men

Women

Rugby sevens

Men's tournament

Sailing

Men

Women

Sepaktakraw

Men

Shooting

Men

Women

Squash

Individual

Swimming

Men

Women

Taekwondo

Men

Women

Weightlifting

Men

Wushu

Taolu

References

Nations at the 2002 Asian Games
2002
Asian Games